Azaza Airport  is an airstrip serving the town of Gedaref in Sudan.

See also
Transport in Sudan

References

 OurAirports - Sudan
 Great Circle Mapper - Azaza
 Azaza
 Google Earth

Airports in Sudan